A plateau is an area of flat terrain that is raised significantly above the surrounding area.

Plateau or plateaux or plateaus may also refer to:

Earth science
Dissected plateau, a highly eroded plateau which may have sharp relief
Oceanic plateau, a submarine area higher that the normal sea floor depth

People
Joseph Plateau (1801–1883), Belgian mathematician
Pierre Plateau (1924–2018), French Roman Catholic prelate

Places
Plateau Department, a department of Benin
Plateau, Benin, an arrondissement in the Collines Department
Plateau, a place name in Inverness County, Nova Scotia, Canada
The Plateau, a neighbourhood in Montreal, Canada
Plateau (Praia), on the island of Santiago, Cape Verde
Plateaux Department (Congo)
Plateaux Department (Gabon)
Lasithi Plateau, a high plain on Crete, Greece
Plateau, Ivory Coast, a district of Abidjan
Plateau (state), a state in Nigeria
Plateaux Region, Togo

Mathematics
Plateau's problem
Plateau's laws
Plateau (mathematics), a region where a function is constant

Art and entertainment
"Plateau" (song), by Meat Puppets, popularized by Nirvana
PlatEAU (band), an electronic band
"The Plateau" (Fringe), a television episode
Plateau (game), an abstract strategy board game
Plateau (museum), a defunct art gallery in Seoul, South Korea

Other uses
Plateau effect, a reduction in the effectiveness of once effective measures over time
Plateau phase, in physiology and human sexuality, the second stage of sexual arousal in the Masters and Johnson model
Plateau Systems, a provider of talent management systems

See also